Mensurius was a bishop of Carthage in the early 4th century during the early Christian Church.

During the Christian persecution of Diocletian he evaded turning over sacred scriptures  to the Roman authorities, but was nevertheless considered a traditor by Donatists. He was accused of "countenancing" the Traditors.

In a letter to Secundus, Bishop of Tigisis, then the senior bishop of Numidia, he explains that he had himself had taken the texts from the church to his own house, and had substituted them for a number of heretical writings, which the authorities had seized without asking for more. But the proconsul, when informed of the deception refused to search the bishop's private house.

Secundus, in his reply, without blaming Mensurius, somewhat pointedly praised the martyrs who in his own province had been tortured and put to death for refusing to deliver up the Scriptures and that he himself had replied to the officials who came to search: "I am a Christian and a bishop, not a traditor." Some such as Petilian even considered him a thurificator.

Mensurius also forbade any to be honoured as martyrs who had given themselves up of their own accord, or who had boasted that they possessed copies of the scriptures which they would not relinquish. Some of these he claimed were criminals and debtors to the state, who thought they might by this means rid themselves of a burdensome life, or else wipe away the remembrance of their misdeeds, or at least gain money and enjoy in prison the luxuries supplied by the kindness of Christians.

In 308, Mensuris hid the deacon Felix who was accused of slander against the Emperor and defended him in Rome. After the acquittal he could not return to Carthage due to the blockade by Maxentius. His death outside of Africa and rejection of his successor Caecilianus contributed to the Donatists schisms in Northern Africa.

References

Citations

Sources
Christian Encyclopedia - Lutheran Missouri Synod - Mensurius

Augustinus, Breuiculus conlationis cum Donatistis III, 13, 25 u. 17, 32, in: CChr 149A, 290-298
D. Voelter, Der Ursprung des Donatismus nach den Quellen untersucht und dargestellt, 1883
Louis Duchesne, Le dossier du Donatisme, in: Mélanges d'archéologie et d'histoire 10, 1890, 628 f.
Paul Monceaux, Histoire littéraire de l'Afrique chrétienne depuis les origines jusqu'à l'invasion arabe (7 volumes : Tertullien et les origines - saint Cyprien et son temps - le IV, d'Arnobe à Victorin - le Donatisme - saint Optat et les premiers écrivains donatistes - la littérature donatiste au temps de saint Augustin - saint Augustin et le donatisme) (19662) 8-25, 204
Hans von Soden (Hrsg.), Urkunden zur Entstehungsgeschichte des Donatismus, 1913 (bearb. v. H.v. Campenhausen 19502), Nr. 4, 5-7
W. H. C. Frend, The Donatist Church, 1952 (19853), 6-17
K. Clancy, When did the Donatist Schism Begin?, in: JThS 28, 1977, 104-109
Emilien Lamirande, La correspondence entre Secundus et Mensurius, in: Œuvres de Saint Augustin 32 (Bibliothèque Augustinienne) 1965, 728
M. Nallino, Un papiro cristiano della raccolta fiorentina. Lettera di Theonas a Mensurio, in: Atene e Roma 11, 1966, 27-30
Jean-Louis Maier, L'épiscopat de l'Afrique romaine, vandale et Byzantine (Bibliotheca Helvetica Romana 11), 1973, 363–364; - ders., Le dossier du donatisme I : Des origines à la mort de Constance II, 303-361 (Texte und Untersuchungen zur Geschichte der altchristlichen Literatur 134), 1987, Index
T.D. Barnes, The Beginnings of Donatism, in: JThS NS 26, 1975, 13-22
Serge Lancel, Les débuts du Donatisme: La date du "Protocole de Cirta" et de l'élection épiscopale de Silvanus, in: RevÉAug 25, 1979, 217-229
André Mandouze, Prosopographie de l'Afrique chrétienne 303-533 (Prosopographie chrétienne du Bas-Empire 1), 1982, 748-749
Bernhard Kriegbaum, Kirche der Traditoren oder Kirche der Märtyrer. Die Vorgeschichte des Donatismus (Innsbrucker Theologische Studien 16), 1986, 59-148
Pauly-Wissowa XV/1, 960–961; - RGG3 IV, 877; - TRE I, 653–655.

4th-century Romans
4th-century bishops of Carthage
4th-century Latin writers
Latin letter writers